Gerald A. Danzer (born 9 November 1938) is professor emeritus of history at the University of Illinois at Chicago. He is a specialist in historical geography, world history, and the use of old maps as historical sources.

Early life
Gerald Danzer was born on 9 November 1938. He received his Ph.D from Northwestern University in 1967 for a dissertation on the subject of "America's Roots in the Past: Historical Publication in America to 1860".

Career 
Danzer is professor emeritus of history at the University of Illinois at Chicago where he has taught an MA program for teachers of history for over thirty years. He is a specialist in historical geography, world history, and the use of old maps as historical sources. He is a former director of the Chicago Neighborhood History Project.

Selected publications

1980s
 People Space and Time. The Chicago Neighborhood History Project: An Introduction to Community History for Schools. University Press Of America, 1986. (Joint author) 
 Public Places: Exploring Their History. Altamira Press, 1987.

1990s
 Discovering Western Civilization Through Maps and Views. Harper Collins, 1991. (With David Buisseret) 
 Mapping World History: A Guide for Beginning Students. Harper Collins, 1992. 
 The Americans. McDougal Littell, Evanston, 1998. (Multiple later and variant editions) 
 World History: An Atlas and Study Guide. Prentice Hall, 1998.

2000s
 An Atlas of World History. Borders Press, 2000. 
 The Americans: Reconstruction to the 21st Century. McDougal Littell, Evanston, 2003.
 Maps in Context: A Workbook for American History, Volume I. Bedford/St. Martin's, 2004. 
 Maps in Context: A Workbook for American History, Volume II. Bedford/St. Martin's, 2004. 
 Chicago's Historic Maps: Resources for Understanding the City. Illinois Historic Preservation Agency, Springfield, 2007. 
 Illinois: A History in Pictures. University of Illinois Press, 2011. 
 The World's Columbian Exposition, 1893: Reconstructing the Geography of Chicago's World's Fair by way of a Fire Insurance Atlas. Privately printed, Chicago, 2014.

References 

1938 births
21st-century American historians
American male non-fiction writers
University of Illinois Chicago faculty
Living people
Historians of Illinois
Historical geographers
Historians of cartography
Northwestern University alumni
21st-century American male writers